Ekaterina Viktorovna Yurlova-Percht (born 23 February 1985) is a Russian biathlete.

She debuted at the World Cup in 2008. In 2015, she won World Championships at 15 km individual distance, which was her first victory at the World Cup.

On 17 October 2015, Yurlova married Josef Percht, masseur of the Austrian biathlon team. Since then she is known as Yurlova-Percht. On 13 November 2016, she gave birth to Kira.

Biathlon results
All results are sourced from the International Biathlon Union.

World Championships
2 medals (1 gold, 1 silver)

*During Olympic seasons competitions are only held for those events not included in the Olympic program.
**The single mixed relay was added as an event in 2019.

World Cup

Individual victories
2 victories (1 In, 1 Pu)

*Results are from UIPMB and IBU races which include the Biathlon World Cup, Biathlon World Championships and the Winter Olympic Games.

References

External links

1985 births
Living people
Sportspeople from Saint Petersburg
Russian female biathletes
Biathlon World Championships medalists
21st-century Russian women